"Pump Up the Jam" is the opening track on Belgian act Technotronic's first album, Pump Up the Jam: The Album (1989). It was released as a single on 18 August 1989 and was a worldwide hit, reaching number two in the United Kingdom in 1989 and on the US Billboard Hot 100 in early 1990. It also peaked at number-one in Belgium, Finland, Iceland, Portugal and Spain. "Pump Up the Jam" has been described as a fusion of hip hop and deep house elements, as an early example of the hip house genre, and it has been considered the first house song to become a hit in the US.

Technotronic's vocalist Ya Kid K was initially overshadowed by Congolese model Felly Kilingi, who appears lip-syncing in the music video and was featured on the first album cover as a marketing tactic. Ya Kid K was ultimately recognized upon a U.S. tour and a repackaged album cover that featured her instead of Felly. In 2005, the song was remixed by DJ-producer D.O.N.S. and reached number one on the British Dance Chart. The Guardian featured the song on their "A History of Modern Music: Dance" in 2011. In 2020, Slant Magazine ranked it at number 40 in their list of "The 100 Best Dance Songs of All Time".

Background and release

Belgian musician, songwriter, and record producer Jo Bogaert had previously had a few successes in his native Belgium, but struggled with exporting the music to other countries. Since some of his previous dance records had experienced popularity in American clubs, he was therefore determined to have a hit in the US. He told in an interview with Los Angeles Times, "It was very difficult for us to export music to other countries. But some of my dance records were popular in U.S. dance clubs and I knew that if I hooked up with the right people, I could make a record that would be a hit in the U.S." After meeting Congolese–Belgian singer and songwriter Ya Kid K (a.k.a. Manuela Barbara Kamosi Moaso Djogi) and British rapper MC Eric (a.k.a. Eric Martin), Bogaert used Ya Kid K's lyrics and vocals and they constructed what would become "Pump Up the Jam", a fresh, compelling fusion of hip hop and deep house elements.

On the unexpected success of the song, Bogaert commented, "I knew, yeah, this was a good track, but my farthest expectation was that it would be a club hit." Martin later told, "The hairs on my arms stood up and I knew that it was history." On the release, Bogaert is credited as producer (as Thomas de Quincey). The song was picked up for US release by SBK Records. Although it used Ya Kid K's lyrics and voice on the track, it was Congolese model Felly Kilingi who was pictured on the album and in the accompanying music video. The reason was because the Belgian ARS record company, who bought the rights to the song, wanted a face fronting it. Ya Kid K was in a hip-hop band at the time, still going to school and did not want to do the promotion and video. ARS then came up with the idea of having Felly promoting the record, and being on the record sleeve.

Critical reception
AllMusic editor Alex Henderson described the song as "highly infectious". Harry Sumrall from Knight Ridder felt it has "a beat the size of Boston, but Felly also sings with an unstoppable R&B swagger." Dennis Hunt from Los Angeles Times declared it as "a hyperkinetic, booming-bass number that may be the most popular dance-club tune since M.A.R.R.S.’ “Pump Up the Volume”." Bob Stanley from Melody Maker wrote that "not only was it a compelling dance music track with a chorus so contagious it could keep you awake at night, it also formed part of the best Top Three in years when it was sandwiched between Black Box and Sidney Youngblood." Diana Valois from The Morning Call described it as a "sensuous groove" that "featured an irresistible bass line that threatened to start an avalanches; unleashed in the clubs, it motivated happy dancers instead."

Pan-European magazine Music & Media commented, "A really hot hip/house track by Technotronic. This track is more than just a beat because of Felly's seductive voice. Another great track from the home of hithouse." David Hinckley from New York Daily News complimented it as "catchy". Parry Gettelman from The Sentinel remarked the song's "throbbing mixture of house music and Euro-disco". Another editor, Rosemary Banks Harris, felt the sound is "intoxicating". A reviewer from People Magazine wrote that the song "is so enticing, the production so crisp and precise, that most people would have to put on a straitjacket to keep from bouncing around to the beat." Gary Graff from The Province described it as "simple, spare and relentlessly rhythmic".

Chart performance
"Pump Up the Jam" proved to be very successful on the charts on several continents. It reached number-one in Flemish Belgium, Finland, Iceland, Portugal, and Spain. In addition, the single also reached number two in Austria, the Netherlands, Switzerland, the United Kingdom, and Western-Germany. On the UK Singles Chart, it reached that position in its sixth week, on October 1, 1989. On the Eurochart Hot 100, it went to number three same month. 

Outside Europe, "Pump Up the Jam" peaked at number four in Canada, but made it to number-one on the RPM Dance/Urban chart. It also reached number-one on the US Billboard Hot Dance Club Play chart and the Cash Box Top 100. On the Billboard Hot 100, it reached number two, being held off the top spot by Michael Bolton's "How Am I Supposed to Live Without You". The single was recognized by the magazine as the US number-one single in sales point, but since Bolton's song had a lead in airplay points, it was given the top position on the Hot 100 chart. In Australia and New Zealand, the single reached number four, while it peaked at number-one also in Zimbabwe.

It was awarded with a gold record in the Netherlands and the United Kingdom, after 40,000 and 400,000 singles were sold. Additionally, it also earned a silver record in France, and a platinum record in Australia and the United States.

Music video
A music video was produced to promote the single, having model Felly Kilingi lip synching the vocals, while dancing, wearing different costumes throughout the video. Catherine Texier for New York Times commented, "Technotronic's "Pump Up the Jam", as commercial as it is, features a sweaty Felly who's all power and muscles, and even though her leotard shows a lot of breast and thigh, her message is more athletic than sexual, or, if it is sex, she's the one pumping the jam." The video was later published by Vevo on YouTube.

Retrospective response
In 1994, Nicole Leedham from The Canberra Times remarked that "Pump Up the Jam" and its follow-up, "Get Up! (Before the Night Is Over)", were pushing the envelope of dance music in the late '80s. In 2004, Stylus Magazine writer Nick Southall named the song "Belgium's finest club banger". An editor of Complex stated that it was the first house track to crack into the mainstream, adding it as "the perfect track at the perfect time." In 2018, Insomniac said it's "one of the best dance songs of all time, because—while it should have disappeared in our cultural memory as a sort of punchline or joke or some one-hit wonder—it's still an infinitely playable tune that works in literally any dancefloor context. It doesn't get old, for some reason, and continues to thrive to this day. It's dancefloor perfection." Josh Baines from Vice called it "a towering masterpiece."

The 2022 mockumentary television series Cunk on Earth repeatedly refers to the song.

Accolades

(*) indicates the list is unordered.

Track listing
Multiple versions and re-releases were produced for the "Pump Up the Jam" singles.

7" single (2-track)
Pump Up The Jam (7" Version) – 3:36
Pump Up The Jam (Jam Edit Mix) – 5:00

Standard CD single (4-track)
7" Version – 3:38 
Vocal Attack – 5:26 
Jam Edit Mix – 4:58 
Original Mix – 5:03

The Sequel (5-track)
Tin Tin Out Of the Radio Mix – 3:52 
Dancing Divaz Radio Mix – 3:51 
London Jam – 4:58 
Tin Tin Out Of the Club Mix – 7:16 
Dancing Divaz Master Mix – 5:33

The Sequel (8-track)
Dancing Divas Radio Mix – 3:52 
Dancing Divas Master Mix – 5:35 
Sequential One Club Mix – 5:16 
Tin Tin Out Club Mix – 7:17 
Sequential One Radio Mix – 3:36 
Tin Tin Out Radio Mix – 3:52 
Sol Brothers Pumpin Mix – 8:19 
Pulsar Village Mix – 5:52

Remixes
U.S. Mix – 6:53 
Sunshine Mix – 4:39 
Hithouse Mix – 7:52 
The Punami Mix – 6:18 
Todd Terry Dome Mix – 5:24 
Top FM Mix – 4:41 
Vocal Attack Mix – 5:22 
B-Room Mix – 4:52 
Red Zone Mix – 7:27
Scuffed Prophecy Mix – 3:03

The Remixes
U.S. Mix by David Morales – 6:56 
Sunshine Mix by David Morales – 4:41 
Hithouse Mix by Peter "Hithouse" Slaghuis – 7:56 
Top FM Mix by Kevin J. and R. Cue – 4:44 
The Punami Mix by The Wing Command – 6:20 
B-Room Mix by David Morales – 4:53
Manouche Jazz Remix by The Lost Fingers – 3:49

96
Tin Tin Out Radio Mix – 3:51 
Sol Brothers Pumpin' Mix – 8:18 
Dancing Divas Mix – 8:12 
Seventies Jam Part 2 – 5:28 
Sol Brothers Deep Vocal Mix – 7:58 
Pulsar Village Mix – 5:50

The Sequel
Tin Tin Out Radio Mix – 3:51 
Sequential One Radio Mix – 3:34 
Pulsar Radio Mix – 3:15 
Village Mix – 5:51 
Dancing Divaz Master Mix – 5:34 
Sequential One Club Mix – 5:15

Charts

Weekly charts

1 "Pump Up the Jam '96" by Technotronic
2 "Pump Up the Jam" by D.O.N.S. featuring Technotronic
3 "Pump Up the Jam 2005" by D.O.N.S. featuring Technotronic

Year-end charts

All-time charts

Certifications and sales

M.C. Sar & the Real McCoy version

In 1989, ZYX Records released a cover version of "Pump Up the Jam" by M.C. Sar & the Real McCoy. The single reached number 16 in West Germany and number 100 on the Dutch Single Top 100.

Track listing

1989 CD maxi single
"Pump Up the Jam" (Original Rap Version) – 5:58
"Pump Up the Jam" (Jam-Jam Quick House Version) – 5:43
"Pump Up the Jam" (Acapella)	— 1:46

"Pump Up the Jam" (Freshbeats and Pieces) – 1:06
"Get Funky" – 4:02

1989 7" single
"Pump Up the Jam" (Original Rap Version – Edit) – 3:51
"Get Funky" – 4:02

"Pump Up the Jam – Rap '98"
"Pump Up the Jam – Rap '98" (radio mix) – 3:20
"Pump Up the Jam – Rap '98" (extended mix) – 4:29
"Pump Up the Jam – Rap '98" (derezon remix) – 3:48
"Pump Up the Jam – Rap '98" (beats and pieces) – 1:31
"Pump Up the Jam – Rap '98" (original US remix '98) – 6:13
"Da Dome" – 3:54

Charts

See also
List of number-one hits of 1989 (Flanders)
List of Cash Box Top 100 number-one singles of 1990
List of RPM number-one dance singles of 1989
List of number-one singles of 1989 (Spain)
List of number-one dance singles of 1989 (U.S.)

References

1989 songs
1989 debut singles
1996 singles
1998 singles
2005 singles
Technotronic songs
Real McCoy (band) songs
Cashbox number-one singles
Number-one singles in Finland
Number-one singles in Iceland
Number-one singles in Portugal
Number-one singles in Zimbabwe
EMI Records singles
SBK Records singles
Songs about dancing
Songs about music
Songs written by Jo Bogaert